Lambert & Stamp is a 2014 American documentary film, produced and directed by James D. Cooper. The film had its world premiere at 2014 Sundance Film Festival on January 20, 2014.

After its premiere at Sundance Film Festival, Sony Pictures Classics acquired the distribution rights of the film. The film later screened at 2014 Sundance London Film Festival on April 18, 2014. The film had its theatrical release in United States on April 3, 2015.

Synopsis
The film narrates how aspiring filmmakers Chris Stamp and Kit Lambert, searching a subject for their underground movie, wound up discovering, mentoring and co-managing English rock band The Who. The film includes never before seen footage of the band from Stamp's personal archive, including film from the 1966 Windsor festival, which was not known to exist.

Reception
Lambert & Stamp received positive reviews from critics. Rob Nelson of Variety, said in his review that "James D. Cooper's impeccably directed debut is a definitive screen bio of the Who and its-rock operatic rise." David Rooney in his review for The Hollywood Reporter praised the film by saying that "A wonderfully alive behind-the-music chronicle that rescues two genuine mavericks from the footnotes of rock history."

References

External links
 Official Website
 
 

2014 films
2014 documentary films
American documentary films
Rockumentaries
The Who
Sony Pictures Classics films
2010s American films